Calling All Mothers is an album by American jazz group the NRG Ensemble, their first after the death of bandleader, and multi-instrumentalist Hal Russell, which was recorded in 1993 and released on the Quinnah label.

Reception

The AllMusic review by William York states that "the album has a nice element of diversity, yet it still coheres well... They play virtually every piece like it's an encore, but, fortunately, the material is strong enough to sustain such intensity".

The DownBeat review by Bill Shoemaker states: "Though the set includes three Russell pieces utilizing everything from nimble swing pastiches to full-bore sax blasts, the compositional strengths of Williams, Hunt and newcomer multi-reedist Ken Vandermark preclude the possibility of NRG ever becoming a ghost band."

Track listing
 "Punch and Judy (For Fred Anderson)" (Ken Vandermark) - 5:26  
 "Chasin' My Tail" (Mars Williams) - 3:28  
 "Memory Seek" (Steve Hunt) - 8:32  
 "Symposium/Mr. Happy" (Williams) - 5:07  
 "You Never Buy Me Anything" (NRG Ensemble) - 6:27  
 "American Tan (For Stanley Kubrick)" (Vandermark) - 7:16  
 "Kiteless String" (Williams) - 3:18  
 "Calling All Mothers" (Hal Russell) - 4:50  
 "You're My Dream" (Hal Russell) - 3:56  
 "Beneath the Weather (For Steve Lacy)" (Vandermark) - 3:57  
 "sraM" (Hal Russell) - 4:20

Personnel
Mars Williams - tenor saxophone, alto saxophone, soprano saxophone
Ken Vandermark - tenor saxophone, clarinet, bass clarinet
Brian Sandstrom - bass, trumpet, electric guitar
Kent Kessler - bass, bass guitar, didgeridoo
Steve Hunt -- drums, vibraphone, marimba, didgeridoo

References

NRG Ensemble albums
1994 albums